John Joseph "Sod" Ryan (December 31, 1905 – December 9, 1964) was an American football tackle who played two seasons in the National Football League with the Chicago Bears and Portsmouth Spartans, playing 5 games with the Bears in 1929 and 3 with the Spartans in 1930. He was good friends with Bears owner George Halas. He played college football for the Detroit Titans of the University of Detroit and attended Kewanee High School in Kewanee, Illinois.

References

External links
Just Sports Stats

1905 births
1964 deaths
American football tackles
Detroit Titans football players
Chicago Bears players
Portsmouth Spartans players
Players of American football from Illinois
People from Kewanee, Illinois